Pluto was a Canadian alternative rock band from Vancouver, British Columbia.  They were nominated for a 1997 Juno Award.  The band consisted of vocalist and guitarist Ian Jones, guitarist Rolf Hetherington, bassist John Ounpuu, and drummer Justin Leigh.

History
Pluto formed in 1993 in Vancouver, British Columbia, Canada.  After independently releasing several singles, the band released its debut album, Cool Way to Feel, in 1995 on Mint Records. The band released a four-song EP, Cut and Paste in 1996. The band subsequently signed to Virgin Records. On June 26, 1996, the band released their eponymous album, which featured the hit single "Paste". "Paste" also appeared on the first Big Shiny Tunes compilation album, which was released in late 1996. The band was nominated for "Best New Group" at the 1997 Juno Awards. The band released one more album in 1998 before breaking up in 1999.

In 2006, A live performance of their song "Failure", recorded on CBC Stereo's Night Lines in 1994, was released on the compilation album Mint Records Presents the CBC Radio 3 Sessions.

The band briefly reunited for Mint Records' 20th Anniversary Concert at Vancouver's Waldorf Hotel on 25 November 2011.

Discography

Albums
 1995 Cool Way to Feel
 1996 Pluto
 1998 Shake Hands with the Future

EP's
 1996 Cut and Paste

Singles

See also

List of bands from Canada

References

Citations 

Musical groups established in 1993
Musical groups disestablished in 1999
Musical groups from Vancouver
Canadian alternative rock groups
Mint Records artists
1993 establishments in British Columbia
1999 disestablishments in British Columbia